Emmerson Amidu Bockarie (born December 23, 1980), better known as Emmerson, is a Sierra Leonean Afropop singer. His music focuses on political topics relating to corruption in the government of Sierra Leone, and he has become well known in his country for lyrics that promote social change. He sings in the Krio and English languages.

Life and career 
Bockarie was born in Kenema, Sierra Leone. He dropped out of a computer engineering program at Njala University to pursue his aspirations in music. His first release was a mixtape called Bodyguard Compilation, Volume One (2002), which contained a single, "Yu Go See Am". A studio album, Borbor Belleh, with supporting vocals by Velma "Vee" Richards, followed in October 2004. His later albums include 2 Fut Arata (2007), Yesterday Betteh Pass Tiday (2010), Rise (2012), Kokobeh (2013), Home and Away (2014), and Survivor (2016). In May 2017 he released a new single, "Love Me". Among his previous singles are "Telescope" (2015) and "Tutu Pati".

One of Emmerson's anti-corruption-themed protest songs, "Borbor Bele" (which means "Potbellied Boy"), spoke to the frustration and disillusionment Sierra Leoneans felt towards their leaders/ruling class. The album largely addressed the kleptocratic institutions and the culture and ideology that drives them. "Borbor Bele" spoke about many of the reasons as to why the incumbent Sierra Leone People's Party should lose to the All People's Congress in the 2007 Sierra Leonean general election.

See also

 African popular music
 Fela Kuti
 Michel Martelly
 Opposition (politics)

References

Further reading

External links
  

Living people
Sierra Leonean male singers
21st-century male singers
People from Kenema
People from Freetown
Mende people
Political music artists
1977 births